Mole Hill is a rounded hill composed of basalt, a volcanic rock, formed during the Eocene epoch of the Paleogene period. It is the eroded remnant of what was an active volcano approximately 47 million years ago, making it one of the youngest volcanoes on the east coast of North America. It is located west of Harrisonburg, Virginia, in Rockingham County.

Description

Mole Hill is an isolated, rounded, tree-covered monadnock in an otherwise relatively flat valley, surrounded by farmland.

The basalt itself, outcropping at the crest of the hill, is "dark greenish gray to grayish black, medium grained, and moderately porphyritic. It is an olivine-spinel basalt with abundant large pale green pyroxene and minor yellow-brown olivine phenocrysts."  The basalt intrudes through the Ordovician Beekmantown Group of carbonate rocks.

Age

The basalt at Mole Hill (and other igneous dikes in the area) was originally thought to be of Paleozoic age by relative age dating using cross-cutting relationships. In 1969, Fullagar and Bottino used K-Ar and Rb-Sr radiometric dating techniques to date rocks that they thought were temporally related to the Devonian Tioga Bentonite, but discovered that the rocks were actually a much younger age of approximately 47 million years, placing them in the Eocene.

Trimble Knob, located in Highland County, is geologically similar to Mole Hill and thought to be contemporaneous with it, along with other intrusive igneous rocks near Ugly Mountain in Pendleton County, West Virginia.

References

External links
 

Landforms of Rockingham County, Virginia
Volcanoes of Virginia
Hills of Virginia
Eocene volcanoes